The 1928 Brown Bears football team represented Brown University as an independent during the 1928 college football season. Led by third-year head coach Tuss McLaughry, the Bears compiled a record of 8–1. Yale gave Brown its only loss on the season.

Schedule

References

Brown
Brown Bears football seasons
Brown Bears football